Rocky Ford is a statutory city located in Otero County, Colorado, United States. The population was 3,957 at the 2010 census.

The community was named for a rocky ford near the original town site.

Geography
Rocky Ford is located at  (38.051000, -103.721387).

Demographics

As of the census of 2000, there were 4,286 people, 1,655 households, and 1,136 families residing in the city. The racial makeup of the city was 72.42% White, 0.40% African American, 1.47% Native American, 0.75% Asian, 0.12% Pacific Islander, 21.86% from other races, and 2.99% from two or more races. Hispanic or Latino of any race were 57.14% of the population.

There were 1,655 households, out of which 33.0% had children under the age of 18 living with them, 48.1% were married couples living together, 15.5% had a female householder with no husband present, and 31.3% were non-families. 28.0% of all households were made up of individuals, and 12.7% had someone living alone who was 65 years of age or older. The average household size was 2.53 and the average family size was 3.07.

In the city, the population was spread out, with 28.2% under the age of 18, 8.7% from 18 to 24, 23.9% from 25 to 44, 21.6% from 45 to 64, and 17.6% who were 65 years of age or older. The median age was 37 years. For every 100 females, there were 95.9 males. For every 100 females age 18 and over, there were 91.2 males.

The median income for a household in the city was $23,359, and the median income for a family was $29,470. Males had a median income of $26,271 versus $17,485 for females. The per capita income for the city was $12,742. About 14.6% of families and 20.3% of the population were below the poverty line, including 28.2% of those under age 18 and 11.6% of those age 65 or over.

Economy
Rocky Ford is noted for its watermelon, cantaloupe and agriculture due to its soil content and fluctuation in temperatures providing great growing conditions.

Transportation
Rocky Ford is part of Colorado's Bustang network. Is it along the Lamar-Pueblo-Colorado Springs Outrider line.

Notable people
Notable individuals who were born in or have lived in Rocky Ford include:
 Lewis Babcock (1943- ), American judge
 Marvin Cordova, Jr. (1985- ), light welterweight boxer
 Paul Gebhard (1917-2015), anthropologist, sexologist
 Blaine Gibson (1918–2015), Disney sculptor (The Hall of Presidents, Haunted Mansion, Pirates of the Caribbean) and animator
 Earl T. Newbry (1900-1995), Oregon Secretary of State
 Manuel T. Pacheco (1941- ), university president
 George W. Swink (1836-1910), land developer, fruit grower
 Robert Swink (1918-2000), film editor
 John D. Vanderhoof (1922-2013), 37th Governor of Colorado
 Ken Kesey, Merry Prankster during the 1960s, and author of One Flew Over The Cuckoo’s Nest

Gallery

See also

 List of municipalities in Colorado

References

External links

 
 CDOT map of the City of Rocky Ford

Cities in Otero County, Colorado
Cities in Colorado
Populated places established in 1887